Two Japanese destroyers have been named Suzutsuki:

 , an  launched in 1942 and stricken in 1945
 , an  launched in 2012

Japanese Navy ship names